"Temma Harbour" is a song written by Robert Anson, under the pseudonym Philamore Lincoln, who released it on his album The North Wind Blew South in January 1970. The song refers to an inlet of the same name on the island of Tasmania.

The song is better known for the version by Welsh folk singer Mary Hopkin, also released in January 1970. It was her first single on Apple Records not to be produced by Paul McCartney, but instead by Mickie Most, who also rearranged the song. It peaked at number 6 on the UK Singles Chart and number 39 on the Billboard Hot 100.

The B-side, "Lontano Dagli Occhi", was written by Sergio Endrigo and Sergio Bardotti and Hopkin's performance had finished in second place at the Sanremo Music Festival in early 1969.

Track listing 
 "Temma Harbour" – 3:20
 "Lontano Dagli Occhi" – 3:21

Charts

References

Mary Hopkin songs
1970 singles
1970 songs
Apple Records singles
Song recordings produced by Mickie Most